Thandeka Mdeliswa (22 May 1986 – 5 September 2020) was a South African actress, best known for her starring role as Khanya in the SABC1 drama series Ikani.

Career
Thandeka's first television role was in 2013, in an episode "Imbiza" of the series Ekasi: Our Stories. She also landed minor roles on local soapie Generations: The Legacy, Isidingo, Rhythm City, and the SABC1 short story series Ngempela.

In 2018 she starred in movie Imoto Kokufa.

Filmography

Television

Death
She was shot on 3 September, in Evander, Mpumalanga. She was rushed to the Steve Biko Academic Hospital in Pretoria where she was in a critical condition. Mdeliswa died on 5 September morning.

References

External links

 

1986 births
2020 deaths
South African television actresses
Deaths by firearm in South Africa
Place of birth missing